Mellinus arvensis, the field digger wasp, is a species of solitary wasp. The wasp can commonly be found from July to late September or October in sandy places.  In hard soil however the female will often try to steal a nest from another member of the same species.  The female is larger than the male. The wasps' nests are underground in sandy burrows with flies for their offspring to eat. The species is yellow and black like many wasp species, but they have a more narrow waist. This species is the most dominant immediately following forest fires.

References

Sphecidae
Hymenoptera of Europe
Taxa named by Carl Linnaeus
Wasps described in 1758